The NWA Worlds Heavyweight Championship is a world heavyweight championship owned and promoted by the American professional wrestling promotion National Wrestling Alliance (NWA). It is the promotion's premier title.

NWA currently recognizes 101 individual World Heavyweight Championship reigns. The inaugural champion was Orville Brown. The longest reigning champion is Lou Thesz, who held the title from November 27, 1949 to March 15, 1956, for a total of 2,300 days (6 years, 3 months, and 16 days); Thesz also holds the record for longest combined reigns at 3,749 days. Shane Douglas is the shortest reign as champion for less than 1 day. Ric Flair holds the record for most reigns with 10. The youngest champion is Chris Candido who won the title at the age of 22, while the oldest champion is Tim Storm, who won it at the age of 51.

Tyrus is the current champion in his first reign. He defeated previous champion Trevor Murdoch and Matt Cardona in a three-way match at Hard Times 3 on November 12, 2022, in New Orleans, Louisiana.

Title history

Names

Reigns

Combined reigns

Footnotes

References

External links
 NWA World Heavyweight Championship

Jim Crockett Promotions championships
National Wrestling Alliance championships
NWA World Heavyweight Championship
Impact Wrestling champions lists
World Championship Wrestling champions lists